A Moose for Jessica is a 1987 non-fiction children's book about a moose named Josh who loved a cow called Jessica. The story is told by Pat A. Wakefield and is illustrated with photographs by Larry Carrara, the owner of the cow.

In 1986, Josh turned up at a farm in Shrewsbury, Vermont and began to show decided attraction toward Jessica, a Hereford cow. He stayed in the vicinity for 76 days. The visit of the moose inspired media attention and attracted tens of thousands of people to the area.

Reception
Kirkus Reviews described the book as "unique, fascinating, and delightful." The New York Times Book Review commented: "This quiet, unpretentious story has the magic of credibility thanks to Pat A. Wakefield's simple, intelligent writing, enhanced by wonderful photographs."

It was named as an Outstanding Science Trade Book for Children by the National Science Teachers Association and as one of the year's best books by Publishers Weekly.

References

External links
Brenda Potter Reynolds. Book Review - A Moose For Jessica in BellaOnline.
Mooseworld: Photographing Moose in Winter contains a photo of Josh and notes

1987 children's books
Children's non-fiction books
American picture books
Dutton Children's Books books
Books about Vermont
Shrewsbury, Vermont
Nature photography